Human Clay were a Swedish / American international side project / supergroup / band  consisting primarily of Talisman members Marcel Jacob and Jeff Scott Soto.

Personnel

Final lineup
 Marcel Jacob - instruments (guitar, bass, drums, programming, keyboard) - 1996-1997
 Jeff Scott Soto - vocals - 1996-1997
 Brian Young - session guitar - 1996-1997

Discography
 Human Clay (1996)
 u4ia (1997)
 Closing the Book.. (compilation, remaster, 2012)

External links 
Official Marcel Jacob site

American hard rock musical groups
Musical groups established in 1996
Musical groups disestablished in 1997
Musical trios
Swedish hard rock musical groups